Apex Jaycee Park is a public, urban park in Apex, North Carolina. Located a short distance to the southwest of downtown Apex, the park is bordered by East Williams Street on the East and Apex Peakway on the West.

The 23 acre park contains softball and soccer fields, a batting cage, and playground as well as a picnic shelter and grill. It is also a trailhead of the Beaver Creek Greenway.

References

Apex, North Carolina
Urban public parks
Parks in Wake County, North Carolina
Tourist attractions in Apex, North Carolina